|}

The Prix des Réservoirs is a Group 3 flat horse race in France open to two-year-old thoroughbred fillies. It is run at Deauville over a distance of 1,600 metres (about 1 mile), and it is scheduled to take place each year in October.

History
The event was established in 1904, and it was originally held at Chantilly. Its title refers to four large reservoirs used for watering Chantilly's racetrack. It was initially open to two-year-olds of either gender and contested over 1,400 metres. It was shortened to 1,000 metres in 1906.

The race was transferred to Longchamp and increased to 1,100 metres in 1907. It was extended to 1,400 metres in 1911. It was abandoned throughout World War I, with no running from 1914 to 1918.

A new distance of 1,600 metres was introduced in 1931. Due to World War II, the event was cancelled in 1939 and 1940. It was staged at Le Tremblay in 1942, and was cancelled again in 1944.

The Prix des Réservoirs was cut to 1,400 metres in 1959. It was reduced to 1,300 metres in 1964. It was not run in 1966, and was extended to 1,500 metres in 1968.

The race reverted to 1,600 metres in 1970. It was restricted to fillies in 1972, and was given Group 3 status in 1976.

The Prix des Réservoirs moved to Deauville in 1996.

Records
Leading jockey (5 wins):
 Roger Poincelet – Marveil (1948), Paracios (1949), Fort Belvedere (1955), Sanctus (1962), Bord a Bord (1964)

Leading trainer (5 wins):
 François Boutin – Suvannee (1975), Clear Picture (1977), Coussika (1981), Restiver (1985), Three Angels (1993)

Leading owner (3 wins):
 Marcel Boussac – Marveil (1948), Paracios (1949), Balkis (1951)
 HH Aga Khan IV – Maroun (1970), Masslama (1990), Zalaiyka (1997)
 Jacques Wertheimer – Belka (1982), Corrazona (1992), Occupandiste (1995)

Winners since 1978

Earlier winners

 1904: Sylvaire
 1905: Auto da Fe
 1906: Ivoire
 1907: Le Nivernais
 1908: Repasseur
 1909: Diabolo / Valdahon *
 1910: Horus
 1911: Abel
 1912: Gretry
 1913: Oreste
 1914–18: no race
 1919: Americain
 1920: Kez
 1921: Awag
 1922: Grand Aigle
 1923: Baal
 1924: First Edition
 1925: Caprice
 1926: Hernani
 1927: Fanfan
 1928: Rapid
 1929: Elima
 1930: Shikari
 1931: Borodino
 1932: Bassara
 1933: Rosier
 1934: Gazetti
 1935: Fastnet
 1936: Paix des Dames
 1937: Flicker
 1938: Cidre Mousseux
 1939–40: no race
 1941: Petitat
 1942: Folle Nuit
 1943: Laborde
 1944: no race
 1945:
 1946: Imphal
 1947: Royal Drake
 1948: Marveil
 1949: Paracios
 1950: Simonetta
 1951: Balkis
 1952: Hattie
 1953: Hathor
 1954:
 1955: Fort Belvedere
 1956: Weeping Willow
 1957: Laura Tudor
 1958: Montrouge
 1959: Notch
 1960: Ploermel
 1961: Ouananiche
 1962: Sanctus
 1963: Red Vagabonde
 1964: Bord a Bord
 1965: Barbare
 1966: no race
 1967:
 1968: Bergano
 1969: Double Splash
 1970: Maroun
 1971: Tom Playfair
 1972: Begara
 1973: Premiere Harde
 1974: Dona Barod
 1975: Suvannee
 1976: Edinburgh
 1977: Clear Picture

* The 1909 race was a dead-heat and has joint winners.

See also
 List of French flat horse races

References
 France Galop / Racing Post:

 france-galop.com – A Brief History: Prix des Réservoirs.
 galop.courses-france.com – Prix des Réservoirs – Palmarès depuis 1980.
 galopp-sieger.de – Prix des Réservoirs.
 horseracingintfed.com – International Federation of Horseracing Authorities – Prix des Réservoirs (2016).
 pedigreequery.com – Prix des Réservoirs – Deauville.

Flat horse races for two-year-old fillies
Deauville-La Touques Racecourse
Horse races in France
Recurring sporting events established in 1904